Samuel Alexander MacDonald (September 7, 1904 – October 21, 2003) was a Canadian sailor who competed in the 1960 Summer Olympics and in the 1964 Summer Olympics. He was born in Charlottetown, Prince Edward Island.

In 1974, Sandy MacDonald was inducted into the PEI Sports Hall of Fame.

References

1904 births
2003 deaths
Canadian male sailors (sport)
Olympic sailors of Canada
Sailors at the 1960 Summer Olympics – Dragon
Sailors at the 1964 Summer Olympics – 5.5 Metre
Sportspeople from Charlottetown